Frederick William Bell, VC (3 April 1875 – 28 April 1954) was an Australian recipient of the Victoria Cross, the highest award for gallantry in the face of the enemy that can be awarded to British and Commonwealth forces.

Early life and career
Bell was born on 3 April 1875 in Perth, Western Australia, and was the first person born in Western Australia to receive the Victoria Cross.

He was 26 years old, and a lieutenant in the West Australian Mounted Infantry during the Second Boer War when the following deed took place for which he was awarded the VC.

Following the end of the war, he went to the United Kingdom and received the decoration from the Prince of Wales during a large coronation parade of colonial troops in London on 1 July 1902.

Bell died on 28 April 1954, and was buried in Canford Cemetery, Bristol, England.

The Frederick Bell ward at the former Repatriation General Hospital, Hollywood was named in his honour.

Medals
The Western Australian Government bought Bell's medals in 1984 from a stepson living in Canada, and the set was placed in the collection of the Western Australian Museum. In July 2016 the medals went on loan to the Australian War Memorial in Canberra, where they will be on display until June 2019.

References

Further reading
 Chamberlain, M., "The Action at Brakpan", Sabretache: The Journal and Proceedings of the Military Historical Society of Australia, Vol.45, No.4, (September 2004), pp. 41–46.

External links
 H. J. Gibbney, 'Bell, Frederick William (1875–1954)', Australian Dictionary of Biography, Volume 7, Melbourne University Press, 1979, p. 253.
 
 The Search for Lt Col FW Bell VC  (highly detailed biography & photos)

1875 births
1954 deaths
Military personnel from Western Australia
Australian Army officers
Australian recipients of the Victoria Cross
British Army personnel of World War I
Second Boer War recipients of the Victoria Cross
People from Perth, Western Australia
4th Royal Irish Dragoon Guards officers
Colonial Service officers